Hans Erik Unander (born 1970) is a Swedish politician, lawyer and former member of the Riksdag, the national legislature. A member of the Social Democratic Party, he represented Dalarna County between July 2009 and October 2010 and between September 2014 and March 2017. He had previously been a substitute member of the Riksdag four times: September 2002 to September 2004 (for Marita Ulvskog); October 2008 to January 2009 (for Anneli Särnblad); and January 2013 to July 2013 (for Roza Güclü Hedin).

Unander is the son of road worker Sven Erik Unander and finance assistant Ulla U (née Albertsson). He has worked as a school caretaker and a painter. He has been a member of the municipal council in Malung Municipality since 1994.

References

1970 births
Living people
Members of the Riksdag 2006–2010
Members of the Riksdag 2014–2018
Members of the Riksdag from the Social Democrats
People from Malung-Sälen Municipality